Blangkejeren is a town in Aceh province of Indonesia and it is the seat (capital) of Gayo Lues Regency.

Climate
Blangkejeren has a tropical rainforest climate (Af) with moderate to heavy rainfall year-round.

References

Populated places in Aceh
Regency seats of Aceh